God, Money, War is the debut studio album of American rapper King Los. It was released on June 23, 2015, by After Platinum Records, 88 Classic, and RCA Records. The album was digital release-only and includes guest appearances from Isaiah Rashad, Marsha Ambrosius, R. Kelly, Ty Dolla $ign, Chrishan, among others.

Commercial performance
God, Money, War debuted at number 68 on the Billboard 200 for the chart dated July 11, 2015 with 8,300 equivalent album units; it sold 7,400 copies in its first week, with the remainder of the units reflecting the album's streaming activity and track sales.

Reception
God Money War received generally positive reviews from music critics. Josh Brown of Can'tstophiphop.com gave the album a 7.5/10 rating saying "King Los proves his prolific skill set translates well to a studio album release. God, Money, War is a polished project featuring heady lyricism that transcends the clever wordplay and superficial punchlines he is known for. While this record may not justify an entire decade of waiting for a King Los studio album, it certainly proves the rapper is deserving of more recognition and acclaim." Liu reviews said "God, Money, War is truly a masterpiece of an album and one of the best albums of the year, if not one of the best of the decade. King Los is a truly talented and honest MC that lays everything on the table; from his lyrical ability to switch rhyme schemes to his intellectual and clever wordplay to his talent for emotional storytelling, his positive and real messaging is one that everyone needs to truly listen to." Rachel Leah of HipHopDX gave the album a 3.5/5 saying "God, Money, War" is a confident step forward for King Los, as he shows he can combine his lyrical prowess with solid song-making".

Track listing

Notes
  signifies a co-producer.

References

2015 debut albums
RCA Records albums
Albums produced by DJ Mustard